Anthelepis is a genus of flowering plants belonging to the family Cyperaceae.

Its native range is Sri Lanka to Hainan and Australia, New Caledonia.

Species:

Anthelepis clarksonii 
Anthelepis guillauminii 
Anthelepis paludosa 
Anthelepis undulata

References

Cyperaceae
Cyperaceae genera